The Black Pacific is the only studio album by the American punk rock band of the same name, which was released on September 14, 2010. Two of their songs, "The System" and "When It's Over", are available for listening on their official website.

Track listing

Personnel
The Black Pacific
 Jim Lindberg -  Vocals, guitar
 Davey Latter - Bass guitar, backing vocals
 Alan Vega - Drums, percussion

Artwork
Industrial Intensio - Album Artwork
Brent Broza - Photography

Production
 Shaun Lopez - Producer, engineer, mixing
 Johnny B. - Production Manager
Eric Broyhill & Michael Hartley	- Mastering

Chart positions
Album

References

The Black Pacific albums
2010 albums
SideOneDummy Records albums